Bouquet of Love is a 1962 album by Percy Faith and His Orchestra. It was released in 1962 by Columbia Records (catalog no. CS8481). It debuted on Billboard magazine's pop album chart on April 14, 1962, peaked at the No. 26 spot, and remained on the chart for five weeks.

Track listing
Side A
 "Blue Moon"
 "Out of This World"
 "Duet"
 "Easy to Love"
 "I Only Have Eyes for You"
 "Soft Lights and Sweet Music"

Side B
 "How High the Moon"
 "Invitation"
 "If I Loved You"
 "Music Until Midnight (Lullaby for Adults Only)"
 "Stella by Starlight"
 "I Concentrate on You"

References

1962 albums
Columbia Records albums
Percy Faith albums